Isputahsu (also transliterated as Išputaḫšu) was a king of Kizzuwatna, probably during the mid 15th century BC (short chronology). He signed a treaty of alliance with the Hittite king Telepinu.

Family
His father was Pariyawatri, who maybe was not a king.

The name of Isputahsu is Hittite and not Luwian.

Reign
The first king of free Cilicia, Isputahsu was recorded as a "great king" in both cuneiform and Hittite hieroglyphs. A treaty between Ishputahshu and Telepinu is recorded in both Hittite and Akkadian.

Sources

Kings of Kizzuwatna
15th-century BC rulers